Polsat Sport News was the first Polish TV station aimed at sports news. Polsat Sport News was launched on May 30, 2011, at 7:00.

History
On October 25, 2010, the program appeared as an internal test channel on channel 146 of Cyfrowy Polsat. On May 25, 2011, the station began testing digital terrestrial television in the second multiplex. On May 30, 2011, regular broadcasting started at 7am, but was not available to digital satellite platform users. On August 11, 2011, the station was made available to the users of the Cyfrowy Polsat. On November 4, 2011, the channel was officially added to n and Telewizji na Kartę. On November 1, 2012, Polsat Sport News launched advertising. The channel starts at 7:00 and ends at 1:15.

On January 2, 2017, Polsat Sport News was replaced by Super Polsat in the second digital terrestrial multiplex.

Polsat Sport News started its broadcast in HD quality on the basis of a satellite concession. It will be available on satellite platforms as well as in cable and IPTV networks, and its schedule will be a continuation of the program offer previously broadcast on the grounds of the Polsat Sport News.

Logo history

References

External links
 Official site of channel
 Official sports site on Polsat

Polsat
Sports television in Poland
Defunct television channels in Poland
Television channels and stations established in 2011
Television channels and stations disestablished in 2017